Oakville is a federal electoral district in Ontario, Canada, that has been represented in the House of Commons of Canada since 1997.

History

It was created in 1996 from parts of Halton and Oakville—Milton ridings.

It consisted initially of the part of the Town of Oakville lying southeast of the Queen Elizabeth Way and Upper Middle Road.

In 2003, it was redefined to consist of the part of the Town of Oakville lying southeast of a line drawn from the northeastern town limit southwest along Dundas Street East, southeast along Eighth Line and southwest along Upper Middle Road to the southwestern town limit. This riding was unchanged after the 2012 electoral redistribution.

The current boundaries include the neighbourhoods of Lakeshore Woods, Bronte, Hopedale, Coronation Park, Kerr Village, Old Oakville, Eastlake, Glen Abbey, College Park, Iroquois Ridge, Clearview, and Joshua Creek.

Demographics 
According to the 2021 Canada Census

Ethnic groups: 63.7% White, 10.4% Chinese, 9.8% South Asian, 3.1% Arab, 2.9% Black, 2.1% Filipino, 1.5% Latin American, 1.2% Korean, 1.2% Indigenous, 1.1% West Asian

Languages: 62.6% English, 6.7% Mandarin, 2.2% Arabic, 1.8% Spanish, 1.6% Portuguese, 1.5% Italian, 1.5% French, 1.4% Urdu, 1.3% Polish, 1.0% Tagalog, 1.0% Punjabi

Religions: 55.2% Christian (29.4% Catholic, 4.8% Anglican, 4.2% United Church, 3.5% Christian Orthodox, 1.5% Presbyterian, 11.8% Other), 7.3% Muslim, 3.0% Hindu, 1.5% Sikh, 1.1% Buddhist, 30.6% None

Median income: $46,000 (2020)

Average income: $86,600 (2020)

Members of Parliament

This riding has elected the following Member of Parliament:

Election results

Note: Conservative vote is compared to the total of the Canadian Alliance vote and Progressive Conservative vote in 2000 election.

Note: Canadian Alliance vote is compared to the Reform vote in 1997 election.

See also
 List of Canadian federal electoral districts
 Past Canadian electoral districts

References

Riding history from the Library of Parliament
 2011 results from Elections Canada
 Campaign expense data from Elections Canada

Notes

Ontario federal electoral districts
Politics of Oakville, Ontario
1996 establishments in Ontario